John Lawton House is a historic home located at Estill, Hampton County, South Carolina. It was built in 1908, and consists of a two-story, wood frame, side-gabled main block with wings and an asymmetrical rear ell. The front facade features a pedimented porch resting on four square Tuscan order columns. The house was substantially renovated in 1947, changing the exterior style from its original Classical Revival appearance to Colonial Revival.

It was listed on the National Register of Historic Places in 2009.

References

Houses on the National Register of Historic Places in South Carolina
Colonial Revival architecture in South Carolina
Neoclassical architecture in South Carolina
Houses completed in 1908
National Register of Historic Places in Hampton County, South Carolina
Houses in Hampton County, South Carolina
1908 establishments in South Carolina